Aretas Akers-Douglas, 1st Viscount Chilston,  (21 October 1851 – 15 January 1926), born Aretas Akers, was a British Conservative statesman who sat in the House of Commons from 1880 until he was raised to the peerage in 1911. He notably served as Home Secretary under Arthur Balfour between 1902 and 1905.

Background and education
Akers-Douglas was born in West Malling, Kent, the son of Reverend Aretas Akers, parson of West Malling, and his wife Frances Maria, daughter of Francis Holles Brandram. He was educated at Eton and University College, Oxford, before being called to the Bar, Inner Temple, in 1875. That same year he took the additional surname of Douglas under royal licence in accordance with a relative's will.

Political career

In 1880, Akers-Douglas was elected as Conservative Member of Parliament for East Kent and held it until it was divided under the Redistribution of Seats Act 1885. In 1883, Akers-Douglas was appointed whip to the Conservatives. In the 1885 general election, he was elected MP for St Augustine's in the county of Kent.  He became Parliamentary Secretary to the Treasury, and retained this post (with a short interval in 1886 when Gladstone returned to power) for the next seven years. He became a Privy Counsellor in 1891.

In 1895, Akers-Douglas was appointed First Commissioner of Works, with a seat in the Cabinet. Seven years later, when Arthur Balfour became Prime Minister, he became Home Secretary on 11 August 1902, and resigned three and a half years later when the Liberals took power.

In 1911, Akers-Douglas was created Viscount Chilston, of Boughton Malherbe in the County of Kent, and Baron Douglas of Baads, in the County of Midlothian. The viscountcy was named for his country house at Chilston Park. During the First World War, Lord Chilston was Chief County Director for the British Red Cross Society and St John Ambulance, in recognition of which he was appointed Knight Grand Cross of the Order of the British Empire (GBE) in the 1920 civilian war honours. Apart from his political career he was a Deputy Lieutenant and Justice of the Peace for Kent, Edinburgh and Dumfries and a lieutenant in the East Kent Yeoman Cavalry.

Family
Lord Chilston married Adeline Mary, daughter of Horatio Austen-Smith, in 1875. They had two sons and five daughters. 
He died at his London home in January 1926, aged 74, and was buried at Boughton Malherbe, Kent. He was succeeded in his titles by his eldest son, Aretas, who became British Ambassador to Russia. Lady Chilston died in February 1929.

Notes

References

External links
 

1851 births
1926 deaths
People from West Malling
Akers-Douglas, Aretas
British Secretaries of State
Alumni of University College, Oxford
English justices of the peace
Knights Grand Cross of the Order of the British Empire
Members of the Privy Council of the United Kingdom
Deputy Lieutenants of Kent
People educated at Eton College
Viscounts in the Peerage of the United Kingdom
Akers-Douglas, Aretas
Akers-Douglas, Aretas
Akers-Douglas, Aretas
Akers-Douglas, Aretas
Akers-Douglas, Aretas
Akers-Douglas, Aretas
Akers-Douglas, Aretas
Akers-Douglas, Aretas
Akers-Douglas, Aretas
UK MPs who were granted peerages
Viscounts created by George V